Alfon is a surname. Notable people with the surname include:

Dov Alfon (born 1961), Israeli journalist and editor
Estrella Alfon (1917–1983), Filipino writer
Fernando Alfón de Ovando, Spanish military and nobleman
Juan Alfon, Spanish painter

See also
Alphons
Alfonso González Martínez, Spanish footballer known as Alfon